Liam Scott Fraser (born February 13, 1998) is a Canadian professional soccer player who plays as a midfielder for Belgian First Division B club Deinze and the Canada national team.

Club career

Early career
He began playing youth soccer with Waterloo United, Peach Arch AC, and Surrey Guildford.

Fraser was part of the Vancouver Whitecaps FC Residency program until January 2013, when he moved to Toronto FC. Fraser was critical of the Whitecaps organization and cited a lack of opportunity as the main reason for his switch.

He represented TFC Academy in both League1 Ontario and the Premier Development League in 2015.

Toronto FC II
In 2015, Fraser was later called up to represent affiliate club Toronto FC II, and went on to make 10 appearances during the 2015 USL season. On June 6, 2015, Fraser made his professional debut in a 0–0 draw with Harrisburg City Islanders.

He signed his first professional contract on February 9, 2016, when he joined Toronto FC II on a permanent basis ahead of the 2016 USL season. In 2017, amongst rumours that he would sign a first team deal with Toronto FC, Fraser was listed #15 in the USL's annual 20 Under 20 list. During the 2017 offseason, Fraser would train with Danish club HB Køge. Upon completion of the 2017 season, Toronto FC II would exercise the option on Fraser's contract for the 2018 season.

Toronto FC
He signed with Toronto FC as a homegrown player on January 19, 2018. On April 14, 2018, Fraser made his debut for the first team, in a Major League Soccer game against the Colorado Rapids. Fraser would have his option for the 2020 season exercised by Toronto, keeping him with the club for 2020.

On May 3, 2021, Fraser was loaned to fellow MLS side Columbus Crew SC for the remainder of the 2021 season, with Toronto receiving $50,000 of General Allocation Money.

Deinze
In January 2022, Fraser joined Belgian First Division B side Deinze on a two and a half-year deal. He made his debut for the club on February 9 against Westerlo.

International

Youth
Fraser was called up to the Under-20 Development Camp squad in Ontario in September 2015, but did not feature under coach Rob Gale. He was then called up for the Under-20 International Camp squad in England in March 2016, but again failed to make his international debut. In August 2016, Fraser was called up to the U-20 team for a pair of friendlies against Costa Rica In February 2017, Fraser was named to Canada's roster for the 2017 CONCACAF U-20 Championship

Fraser was named to the Canadian U-23 provisional roster for the 2020 CONCACAF Men's Olympic Qualifying Championship on February 26, 2020.

Senior
After multiple camp call-ups in 2018 and 2019, Fraser made his debut for the Canadian senior team on October 15, 2019, as a substitute in a 2–0 win against the USA. In July 2021 Fraser was named to Canada's squad for the 2021 CONCACAF Gold Cup.

In November 2022, Fraser was named to Canada's squad for the 2022 FIFA World Cup.

Career statistics

Club

International

Honours

Club 
Columbus Crew
 Campeones Cup: 2021

References

External links
 

1998 births
Living people
Canadian soccer players
Canada men's youth international soccer players
Canada men's international soccer players
Columbus Crew players
Toronto FC II players
Toronto FC players
K.M.S.K. Deinze players
Association football midfielders
Soccer players from Toronto
USL Championship players
Major League Soccer players
Challenger Pro League players
Homegrown Players (MLS)
Canadian expatriate soccer players
Expatriate soccer players in the United States
Canadian expatriate sportspeople in the United States
Expatriate footballers in Belgium
Canadian expatriate sportspeople in Belgium
2021 CONCACAF Gold Cup players
Vancouver Whitecaps Residency players
2022 FIFA World Cup players